Communauté d'agglomération du Grand Annecy is the communauté d'agglomération, an intercommunal structure, centred on the city of Annecy. It is located in the Haute-Savoie department, in the Auvergne-Rhône-Alpes region, southeastern France. It was created in January 2017 by the merger of the former communauté de l'agglomération d'Annecy and four communautés de communes. Its area is 515.0 km2. Its population was 203,784 in 2018, of which 128,199 in Annecy proper.

Composition
The Communauté d'agglomération du Grand Annecy consists of the following 34 communes:

Alby-sur-Chéran
Allèves
Annecy
Argonay
Bluffy
Chainaz-les-Frasses
Chapeiry
Charvonnex
Chavanod
Cusy
Duingt
Entrevernes
Épagny-Metz-Tessy
Fillière
Groisy
Gruffy
Héry-sur-Alby
La Chapelle-Saint-Maurice
Leschaux
Menthon-Saint-Bernard
Montagny-les-Lanches
Mûres
Nâves-Parmelan
Poisy
Quintal
Saint-Eustache
Saint-Félix
Saint-Jorioz
Saint-Sylvestre
Sevrier
Talloires-Montmin
Veyrier-du-Lac
Villaz
Viuz-la-Chiésaz

References

Annecy
Annecy